The Divisadero Group is a group of geological formations in the Magallanes Basin (Chile) or Austral Basin (Argentina) of northwestern Patagonia. It overlies the Coihaique Group. The group is chiefly made up of pyroclastic rocks and lavas of the calc-alkaline magma series. Rocks are of andesite and rhyolite composition.

Geographic extent 
In Chile, the formation crops out in Aysén Region while in Argentina it can be found in Chubut Province.

Tectonic movements during the Miocene have significantly deformed Divisadero Group.

See also

References 

Geologic groups of South America
Geologic formations of Argentina
Geologic formations of Chile
Lower Cretaceous Series of South America
Cretaceous Argentina
Cretaceous Chile
Albian Stage
Aptian Stage
Cretaceous volcanism
Groups
Geology of Aysén Region
Geology of Chubut Province